Ministry of External Affairs may refer to:

 Ministry of External Affairs (Andorra)
 Ministry of External Affairs and Defence, Ceylon (former)
 Ministry of External Affairs (India)
 Ministry of External Affairs (Malaysia)
 Ministry of External Affairs (Rhodesia)
 Ministry of External Affairs (Romania)
 Ministry of External Affairs (Soviet Union)
 Ministry of Foreign Affairs and Trade (New Zealand), formerly the Ministry of External Affairs
 Ministry of External Affairs (Sri Lanka)

See also
 Ministry of Foreign Affairs